The Fire Temple of Kazerun is a historical Fire Temple belongs to the Sasanian Empire and is located in Kazerun County, Fars Province.

Sources

Buildings and structures in Fars Province
Kazerun County

Fire temples in Iran
National works of Iran